In Australian folklore, the Queensland tiger is a creature said to live in the Queensland area in eastern Australia.

Also known by a native name, yarri, it is described as being a dog-sized feline with stripes and a long tail, prominent front teeth and a savage temperament.  It has been hypothesized to be a survivor or descendant of the large predatory marsupial Thylacoleo, officially considered to be extinct, or possibly a large feral cat variant (given possible discrepancies with thylacoleo dentition). In 1926 A. S. le Souef described a "Striped marsupial cat" in The Wild Animals of Australasia, this information later also included in Furred Animals of Australia, by Ellis Troughton, longtime curator of mammals in the Australian Museum.

History

The earliest documented witness reports of a Queensland marsupial tiger date from 1871, with indigenous traditions of the yarri preceding these.

Lumholtz writes in 1878I learned that on the summit of the Coast Mountains, before mentioned, there lived two varieties of mammals which seemed to me to be unknown to science:  but I had much difficulty in acquiring this knowledge.  One of the animals [the local Aborigines] called yarri.  From their description I conceived it to be a marsupial tiger.  It was said to be about the size of a dingo, though its legs were shorter and its tail long, and it was described ... as being very savage.  If pursued it climbed up the trees, where the natives did not dare follow it, and by gestures they explained to me how at such times it would growl and bite their hands.  Rocky retreats were its most favourite habitat, and its principal food was said to be in a little brown variety of wallaby common in Northern Queensland scrubs.  Its flesh was not particularly appreciated ... and if they accidentally killed a yarri they gave it to their old women.  In Western Queensland I heard much about an animal which seemed to me to be identical with the yarri here described, and a specimen was once nearly shot by an officer of the black police in the regions I was now visiting [Herbert River]. Lumholtz goes on to contrast the description of this animal with a leaf-eating species recognisable as a tree kangaroo, possibly that now known as Lumholtz's, after the author's work in scientific appraisal of these and other species of the region.

Reports have come consistently from the Northeast of Queensland, and indicate a fast and agile creature (Welfare & Fairley, 1981).

Though these have diminished in number since the 1950s, they have continued (the Beast of Buderim being one recent example of the phenomenon).  Such sightings in modern context, when able to be investigated further, have been universally identified as introduced domestic cats gone feral — natural selection tends favour proportions, markings and behaviours more commonly associated with actual wild species, after only a few generations in the wild.  The domestic cat was introduced to Australia some hundreds of years ago, and have dispersed (and been dispersed) nationally, with only some islands remaining free from the declared pest.

Thylacoleo, an animal of similar size and predatory habits, did live in Australia as recently as the late Pleistocene period, perhaps coexisting with the very first humans that arrived at Australia who were the ancestors of modern Australian Aboriginals. However, scientists estimate that Thylacoleo became extinct 30,000 years ago. Modern sightings of an animal described as remarkably like Thylacoleo have led some researchers to speculate that a small relict population has somehow survived in remote areas. Cryptozoologists who promote the theory of survival of the Tasmanian tiger or thylacine Thylacinus cynocephalus, a Thylacinid, and also currently accepted as extinct, favour proposed survival of the Queensland tiger.  The fundamental difference between the two cases, however, is that the last Tasmanian tiger in captivity died in 1936, and the species was not officially declared as extinct until 1986.  This makes the prospect of species survival of the thylacine more likely than that of Thylacoleo.

Thylacine or Thylacoleo?
In his 1965 revision of the book Furred Animals of Australia, Ellis Troughton proposed that the Queensland tiger was merely a mainland variant of the thylacine. When discussing sightings of the Queensland tiger or animals thought to be the Queensland tiger, people sometimes refer to them as thylacines, though there are distinct and consistent differences in the descriptions of the animals (i.e.: head shape, position and colour of stripes, arboreal habits).

While Cape York artist Percy Trezise believes the region is home to the thylacine, others have cited the popular urban myth of American soldiers bringing pumas to Queensland during World War II, with local Bob Whiston and tree kangaroo expert Roger Martin suggesting that sightings are of either Lumholtz's or Bennett's tree kangaroos, unfamiliar animals which walk on four legs when terrestrial and are found in the areas from which reports originate (this concurs with one of Bernard Heuvelmans' theories regarding some sightings).

In popular culture

The theory of continued Thylacoleo presence on mainland Australia and thylacine presence in Tasmania has been covered on various Television shows including an episode of Animal Planet's show Animal X and on The National Geographic Channel.  Individual sightings of the Queensland marsupial tiger continue to appear in newspapers, though in far less numbers than formerly.  In the 1970s, naturalist Janeice Plunkett collected over 100 reports of sightings or shootings of "tigers", including reports clearly indicating that the animal observed was a marsupial. Some writers believe that, if the animal did formerly exist, it may now be extinct, given the diminishing numbers of tiger quolls and northern quolls across the same region.

See also
 Drop bear

References

Australian legendary creatures
Purported mammals